Huai Thap Salao is a river in Uthai Thani Province, Thailand. It is a tributary of the Sakae Krang River, part of the Chao Phraya River basin.

Thap Salao